The Glastenbury Wilderness is one of eight wilderness areas in the Green Mountain National Forest in the U.S. state of Vermont. The area, located northeast of Bennington, Vermont, is managed by the U.S. Forest Service. It was created by the New England Wilderness Act of 2006.

The Long Trail (which coincides with the Appalachian Trail in this region) crosses the entire length of the wilderness from south to north. The wilderness is traversed by several other hiking trails including the Bald Mountain Trail, the West Ridge Trail, and the Little Pond Trail.

The hilly terrain of the area includes several summits surpassing  in elevation.

See also

 List of largest wilderness areas in the United States
 List of wilderness areas of the United States
 National Wilderness Preservation System
 Wilderness Act

References

Wilderness areas of Vermont
IUCN Category Ib
Protected areas of Bennington County, Vermont
Green Mountain National Forest
Protected areas established in 2006
2006 establishments in Vermont